Lewisia sacajaweana is a species of flowering plant in the family Montiaceae known by the common name Sacajawea's bitterroot. It is endemic to Idaho, where it is known from approximately two dozen sites, with about 75 percent of them in Boise National Forest.

The species is named in honor of Sacagawea, Native American guide to the Lewis and Clark Expedition. It is part of a genus named for Meriwether Lewis of the same expedition.

References

sacajaweana
Flora of Idaho
Endemic flora of the United States